Miss Universe 2012 was the 61st Miss Universe pageant, held at the PH Live at Planet Hollywood Resort & Casino in Las Vegas, Nevada, United States on December 19, 2012. 

At the end of the event, Leila Lopes of Angola crowned Olivia Culpo of the United States as Miss Universe 2012. It is the United States' first victory in 15 years, and the eighth victory of the country— the most in the pageant's history.

Contestants from 89 countries and territories competed in this year's pageant, surpassing the previous record of 86 contestants in 2006. The pageant was hosted by Andy Cohen and Giuliana Rancic, with Jeannie Mai as backstage correspondent. American rock band Train and Australian musician Tim Omaji performed in this year's pageant.

Background

Location and date
In March 2012, the Miss Universe Organization announced that the pageant was postponed to mid-December since the broadcaster, NBC, is unable to broadcast the pageant at the same time as the 2012 Summer Olympics and the United States presidential election. In April 2012, it was announced that Bangladesh would host the pageant on December 13, 2012. However, in July, the Bangladeshi president announced that they will not host the pageant because of financial constraints.

It was rumored that Guadalajara, Isla Margarita, Sun City, and Jakarta were to host the competition. However, in August 2012, the Dominican government received a proposal from the Miss Universe Organization to host the competition on December 11, 2012. The Dominican Republic had once hosted the Miss Universe pageant in 1977 in Santo Domingo. The Miss Universe Organization was considering hosting the final night at the Hard Rock Resort and Casino in Punta Cana. However, The Dominican government said that the country was not able to provide any kind of financial assistance to the pageant. Therefore, the Dominican Republic was not granted the hosting rights due to the country not being able to fulfill the requirements asked by the Miss Universe Organization.

The backing out of the Dominican Republic caused the Miss Universe Organization to host the pageant in Las Vegas, Nevada in December deviating from the customary mid-year scheduling of the pageant. On September 27, 2012, the Miss Universe Organization confirmed that the 2012 edition of the pageant will be at the Planet Hollywood Resort & Casino in Las Vegas, Nevada, on December 19, 2012.

Selection of participants 
Contestants from 89 countries and territories were selected to compete in the competition. Seven of these delegates were appointees to their positions after being a runner-up of their national pageant or being selected through a casting process, while nine were selected to replace the original dethroned winner.

Adwoa Yamoah, the first runner-up of Miss Universe Canada 2012, was appointed to represent Canada after Sahar Biniaz, Miss Universe Canada 2012, withdrew due to personal reasons. Ioánna Yiannakoú, the runner-up of Star Cyprus 2012, was appointed to represent Cyprus after Ntaniella Kefala, Star Cyprus 2012, withdrew due to undisclosed reasons. Carola Durán, Miss Dominican Republic 2012, originally was supposed to compete in Miss Universe. However, Durán was dethroned after it was discovered that she was previously married and is divorced. Due to this, Dulcita Lieggi, the first runner-up of Miss Dominican Republic 2012, replaced Durán as the representative of the Dominican Republic in Miss Universe. Natalie Korneitsik, the first runner-up of Miss Estonia 2012, was appointed to represent Estonia after Kätlin Valdmets, Miss Estonia 2012, withdrew due to lack of sponsorship. Marie Payet, the first runner-up of Miss France 2012, was appointed to represent France due to a potential date conflict between Miss Universe 2012 and Miss France 2013, at which Delphine Wespiser, Miss France 2012, was contractually obligated to be present.

Channa Divouvi, the first runner-up of Miss Gabon 2012, was appointed to represent Gabon due to a potential date conflict between Miss Universe 2012 and Miss Gabon 2013, at which Marie-Noëlle Ada, Miss Gabon 2012, was contractually obligated to be present. Shilpa Singh, the first runner-up of I Am She 2012, was appointed to represent India after Urvashi Rautela, Miss Universe India 2012, withdrew due to being underage as well as being the reigning Miss Tourism Queen of the Year International at that time. Avianca Böhm, Miss Universe New Zealand 2012, was replaced by her first runner-up, Talia Bennett, due to citizenship issues. Isabella Ayuk, Most Beautigul Girl in Nigeria 2012, switched pageants with Damiete Charles Granville, Most Beautiful Girl in Nigeria Universe 2012, due to being overage at Miss World.

Andrea Huisgen, Miss Spain 2011, originally was scheduled to participate in this edition. However, the Miss Spain organization fell into bankruptcy and the license to participate in Miss Universe went to a new organization called Miss Universe Spain. Although the rights to participate at Miss Universe was given to the Miss Universe Spain organization, the organization still allowed Huisgen to compete at Miss Universe after giving up her contract with Miss Spain.

The 2012 edition saw the debuts of Gabon and Lithuania, and the returns of Bulgaria, Ethiopia, Namibia, and Norway. Bulgaria, Ethiopia, and Namibia last competed in 2009, while Norway last competed in 2010. Egypt, Kazakhstan, Portugal, Slovenia, Turks and Caicos Islands, and the United States Virgin Islands withdrew. Aĭnur Tolyeuova of Kazakhstan withdrew due to being underage. Egypt, Portugal, Slovenia, Turks and Caicos, and the U.S. Virgin Islands withdrew after their respective organizations failed to hold a national competition or appoint a delegate.

Miss Universe allows transgender women to compete 
Beginning in 2013, the Miss Universe Organization allows transgender women to compete in the competition following the consultations with the GLAAD Organization. The changes in the rules came after Jenna Talackova, a transgender woman competing at Miss Universe Canada 2012, was reinstated back into the Miss Universe Canada 2012 pageant. Talackova was initially removed from the competition by the organization because she "did not meet the requirements to compete". However, a month after the disqualification of Talackova, the Miss Universe Organization allowed Talackova to compete provided that "she meets the legal gender recognition requirements of Canada, and the standards established by other international competitions." Talackova eventually placed in the Top 12 of Miss Universe Canada 2012, and is also one of the four contestants to win the Miss Congeniality award.

Six years after the pageant rules were changed, Ángela Ponce of Spain made history in 2018 as the first transgender contestant competing at Miss Universe.

Results

Placements

Special awards

Best National Costume

Pageant

Format 
Same with 2011, 15 semifinalists were chosen through the preliminary competition— composed of the swimsuit and evening gown competitions and closed-door interviews. The internet voting is still being implemented, with fans being able to vote for another delegate to advance into the semifinals, making the number of semifinalists 16. However, the winner of the Fan Vote was not revealed during the final telecast. The top 16 competed in the swimsuit competition and were narrowed down to the top 10 afterward. The top 10 competed in the evening gown competition and were narrowed down to the top 5 afterward. The top 5 competed in the question and answer round and the final look.

Selection committee

Preliminary competition 
 Carlos Anaya – Host for My Lifestyle Extra
 Beverly Frank – Executive Vice-president for Business Affairs for 19 Entertainment
 Duane Gazi – International scout with the Trump Model Management
 Michael Greenwald – Vice-President of Talent at Don Buchwald & Associates
 Jimmy Nguyen – Prominent entertainment and new media lawyer
 Corinne Nicolas – President of the Trump Model Management
 Amy Sadowsky – Senior Vice-President of Public Relations for Planet Holywood International
 Crystle Stewart – Miss USA 2008 from Texas

Final telecast 
 Nigel Barker – Fashion photographer and the host of The Face
 Diego Boneta – Singer, actor and songwriter from Mexico
 Scott Disick – Businessman, entrepreneur and reality star of Keeping Up With the Kardashians
 Brad Goreski – Fashion stylist and reality star of It's a Brad, Brad World
 Masaharu Morimoto – Chef and star of Iron Chef and Iron Chef America from Japan
 Ximena Navarrete – Miss Universe 2010 from Mexico
 Pablo Sandoval – Professional baseball player from Venezuela
 Lisa Vanderpump – Reality star of The Real Housewives of Beverly Hills
 Kerri Walsh Jennings – Professional beach volleyball player and triple gold medalist in Summer Olympics

Contestants 
89 contestants competed for the title.

Notes

References

External links

 Miss Universe official website

2012 beauty pageants
2012
2012 in the United States
Beauty pageants in the United States
2012 in Nevada
December 2012 events in the United States
Zappos Theater